Robert Mullan (also Bob Mullan) is a British film director, writer and producer. He is also an author. He wrote and directed Letters to Sofija, Gitel and We Will Sing.
He has produced over 40 documentaries, for the BBC, Granada, Anglia Television, Channel4 and for broadcasters outside the UK.

His latest film is Mad to Be Normal, a biography of R. D. Laing with David Tennant in the lead role.

Books
 Mad to be Normal: Conversations with R.D. Laing (1995) as Bob Mullan 
 R.D.Laing: A Personal View (1999)  as Bob Mullan 
 Therapists on Therapy (1996) Edited by Bob Mullan

References

External links
 
 Amazon page
 Short biography at Gizmo Films

English film directors
English writers
Living people
Year of birth missing (living people)